Benjamin or Ben Brooks may refer to:

 Benjamin Brooks (politician) (born 1950), member of the Maryland Senate
Benjamin Brooks (businessman), see Clay Street Hill Railroad
Benjamin Brooks (cyclist) in 2000 Tour de Langkawi
Benjamin Brooks, character in Absolution
 Ben Brooks (politician) (born 1958), Republican member of the Alabama Senate
 Ben Brooks (novelist) (born 1992), English author

See also
Benjamin Brook (1776–1848), English nonconformist minister and religious historian